Simon Smith may refer to:

Simon Smith (drummer), drummer in several British indie rock bands
Simon Smith (footballer), former footballer and now goalkeeping coach
Simon Smith (cricketer) (born 1979), Scottish cricketer
Simon Smith (Wisconsin politician), Wisconsin State Assemblyman
"Simon Smith and the Amazing Dancing Bear", a 1967 song
Simon Smith (diplomat) (born 1958), British Ambassador to South Korea and formerly Ukraine and Austria
Simon J. Smith, British actor, animator and director
Simon Smith (rugby union) (born 1960), British rugby player
Simon Kuznets (born 1901), American economist